The Aghori (from Sanskrit) are a monastic order of ascetic Shaivite sadhus based in Uttar Pradesh, India. They are the only surviving sect derived from the Kāpālika tradition, a Tantric, non-Puranic form of Shaivism which originated in Medieval India between the 7th and 8th century CE. Similarly to their predecessors, Aghoris usually engage in post-mortem rituals, often dwell in charnel grounds, smear cremation ashes on their bodies, and use bones from human corpses for crafting kapāla (skull cups which Shiva and other Hindu deities are often iconically depicted holding or using) and jewellery.

Their practices are sometimes considered contradictory to orthodox Hinduism. Many Aghori gurus command great reverence from rural populations and are widely referred to in medieval and modern works of Indian literature, as they are supposed to possess healing powers gained through their intensely eremitic rites and practices of renunciation and tápasya.

Beliefs and doctrines
Aghoris are devotees of Shiva manifested as Bhairava, and monists who seek moksha from the cycle of reincarnation or saṃsāra. This freedom is a realization of the self's identity with the absolute. Because of this monistic doctrine, the Aghoris maintain that all opposites are ultimately illusory. The purpose of embracing pollution and degradation through various customs is the realization of non-duality (advaita) through transcending social taboos, attaining what is essentially an altered state of consciousness and perceiving the illusory nature of all conventional categories.

Aghori rituals, which are performed precisely to oppose notions of purity commonplace in orthodox Hinduism, are typically macabre in nature. The practices of Aghoris vary and include living in cemeteries, smearing cremation ashes on their bodies, using human skulls for decoration and bowls, smoking marijuana, drinking alcohol, and meditating on top of corpses. Although contrary to mainstream Hinduism, these practices exemplify the Aghori philosophy of criticizing commonplace social relations and fears through the use of culturally offensive acts. Furthermore, they demonstrate the Aghoris' acceptance of death as a necessary and natural part of the human experience. The Aghori tradition is basically categorized under the shamanic marg of sadhana.

Aghoris are not to be confused with Shivnetras, who are also ardent devotees of Shiva, but do not indulge in extreme, tamasic ritual practices. Although the Aghoris enjoy close ties with the Shivnetras, the two groups are quite distinct, Shivnetras engaging in sattvic worship.

Aghoris base their beliefs on two principles common to broader Shaiva beliefs: that Shiva is perfect (having omniscience, omnipresence and omnipotence) and that Shiva is responsible for everything that occurs: all conditions, causes and effects. Consequently, everything that exists must be perfect and to deny the perfection of anything would be to deny the sacredness of all life in its full manifestation, as well as to deny the Supreme Being.

Aghoris believe that every person's soul is Shiva, but is covered by  "eight great nooses or bonds", including sensual pleasure, anger, greed, obsession, fear and hatred. The practices of the Aghoris are centered around the removal of these bonds. Sādhanā in cremation grounds is used in an attempt to destroy fear; sexual practices with certain riders and controls attempt to release one from sexual desire; being naked is used in an attempt to destroy shame. On release from all the eight bonds, the soul becomes sadāśiva and obtains moksha.

History

Although akin to the Kapalika ascetics of medieval Kashmir, as well as the Kalamukhas, with whom there may be a historical connection, the Aghoris trace their origin to Baba Keenaram, an ascetic who is said to have lived 150 years, dying during the second half of the 18th century. Dattatreya the avadhuta, to whom has been attributed the esteemed nondual medieval song, the Avadhuta Gita, was a founding adi guru of the Aghor tradition according to Barrett (2008: p. 33):

Aghoris also hold sacred the Hindu deity Dattatreya as a predecessor to the Aghori Tantric tradition. Dattatreya was believed to be an incarnation of Brahma, Vishnu, and Shiva united in the same singular physical body. Dattatreya is revered in all schools of Tantra, which is the philosophy followed by the Aghora tradition, and he is often depicted in Hindu artwork and its holy scriptures of folk narratives, the Puranas, indulging in Aghori "left-hand" Tantric worship as his prime practice.

An aghori believes in getting into total darkness by all means, and then getting into light or self realizing. Though this is a different approach from other Hindu sects, they believe it to be effective. They are infamously known for their rituals that include such as shava samskara or shava sadhana (ritual worship incorporating the use of a corpse as the altar) to invoke the mother goddess in her form as Smashan Tara (Tara of the Cremation Grounds).

In Hindu iconography, Tara, like Kali, is one of the ten Mahavidyas (wisdom goddesses) and once invoked can bless the Aghori with supernatural powers. The most popular of the ten Mahavidyas who are worshiped by Aghoris are Dhumavati, Bagalamukhi, and Bhairavi. The male Hindu deities primarily worshiped by Aghoris for supernatural powers are manifestations of Shiva, including Mahākāla, Bhairava, Virabhadra, Avadhuta, and others.

Barrett (2008: p. 161) discusses the "charnel ground sādhanā" of the Aghora in both its left and right-handed proclivities and identifies it as principally cutting through attachments and aversion and foregrounding primordiality; a view uncultured, undomesticated:

In this sense, the Aghora sādhanā is a process of unlearning deeply internalized cultural models. When this sādhanā takes the form of charnel ground sādhanā, the Aghori faces death as a very young child, simultaneously meditating on the totality of life at its two extremes. This ideal example serves as a prototype for other Aghor practices, both left and right, in ritual and in daily life."

Adherents
Although Aghoris are prevalent in cremation grounds across India, Nepal, and even sparsely among similar cremation grounds in South East Asia, the secrecy of this religious sect fosters no aspiration to social recognition and notoriety among its practitioners.

Spiritual headquarters
Hinglaj Mata is the Kuladevata (patron goddess) of the Aghori. The main Aghori pilgrimage centre is Kina Ram's hermitage or ashram in Ravindrapuri, Varanasi. The full name of this place is Baba Keenaram Sthal, Krim-Kund. Here, Kina Ram is buried in a tomb or samadhi which is a centre of pilgrimage for Aghoris and Aghori devotees. Present head (Abbot), since 1978, of Baba Keenaram Sthal is Baba Siddharth Gautam Ram.

According to Devotees, Baba Siddharth Gautam Ram is reincarnation of Baba Keenaram himself. Apart from this, any cremation ground would be a holy place for an Aghori ascetic. The cremation grounds near the Shakti Pithas, 51 holy centres for worship of the Hindu Mother Goddess scattered across South Asia and the Himalayan terrain, are key locations preferred for performing sadhana by the Aghoris. They are also known to meditate and perform sadhana in haunted houses.

Medicine
Aghori practice healing through purification as a pillar of their ritual. Their patients believe the Aghoris are able to transfer health to, and pollution away from patients as a form of "transformative healing". However, according to Aghori belief, this pollution must be moved into another person. In some cases, Aghoris make the claim that human or animal sacrifice is necessary to successfully complete a healing. Some aghori scholarship calls this process the transfer of karma. Such practices are in decline and not commonly seen.

Modern Aghor practices
The Aghor tradition, which originated as confined and reclusive, has transformed since Baba Bhagwan Ramji's reforms to Aghor Yoga practices. By changing practices that have traditionally been shunned by conventional norms, Aghor Yoga now has entered mainstream society. Today, Aghor Yoga focuses upon forming a balanced personal practice, placing importance on both sadhana (one's own spiritual practice) as well as seva (selfless service).

Baba Bhagwan Ramji
Recognizing the need for change within his society, Baba Bhagwan Ramji renewed the socially conscious spirit of Baba Kinaram when he established a new ashram named Awadhut Bhagwan Ram Kusht Sewa Ashram (The Awadhut Bhagwan Ram Leprosy Service Ashram) at Parao, Varanasi. Baba Bhagwan Ramji dedicated Parao Ashram to helping the poor and the afflicted, and included a leprosy hospital within the ashram grounds. By shifting Aghor Yoga's focus to helping those who are suffering within society, Baba Bhagwan Ramji modernized the ancient Aghor tradition.

In order to maintain the continuum of the Aghor tradition, Baba Bhagwan Ramji initiated one of his disciples, Baba Siddharth Gautam Ram, to be the head of Krim Kund and of the Aghor lineage. The Krim Kund and Parao ashrams are situated on the opposite sides of the Ganges River in Varanasi, India.

Baba Bhagwan Ramji also established Sri Sarveshwari Samooh Ashram, a secular social service organization that has worked throughout northern India. The Aghor lineage now includes many Ashrams in various locations in India and a number of centers and Ashrams in other countries.

During his life, Aghoreshwar Bhagwan Ramji also guided the reform of ancient Kina Ram Aghori practices.

Ashrams
All of the ashrams started by Baba Bhagwan Ramji and his disciples around the world are continually dedicated to service. Contemporary Aghor practices focus especially on providing help and services to those who are downtrodden.

Sri Sarveshwari Samooh Ashram remains invested in social issues, notably working to eliminate the dowry system, offering free leprosy treatment, and providing free schooling for impoverished children.

The Sonoma Ashram in Sonoma, California, founded in 1990, is the current seat of Aghor Yoga in the United States. The mission of Sonoma Ashram is to foster spiritual growth in individuals.

The Sonoma Ashram's sister ashram, Aghor Foundation, was established in 2001 on the bank of the Ganges River in the Varanasi, India and offers a safe home for orphaned and abandoned children. The Aghor Foundation also operates other social service projects, including the Anjali School, a tuition-free school for neighborhood children living in poverty and Vision Varanasi, a free eye clinic. Notably, The Aghor Foundation also runs Project Shakti, which offers vocational training for underprivileged women in Varanasi. The Aghor Foundation recently began to construct the Amrit Sagar Environmental Center, "a working model of the best environmental practices and a teaching center demonstrating… sustainable practices."

See also
Aghor Yoga
Dakota Wint

References

Further reading

Vishwanath Prasad Singh Ashthana, Aghor at a glance
Vishwanath Prasad Singh Ashthana, Krim-kund Katha
Howard, John R (2018) The Aghorī: Modern Myth or Ancient Truth, https://www.academia.edu/42043486/The_Aghor%C4%AB_Modern_Myth_or_Ancient_Truth

External links

 "Conversation with an Aghori Baba" videotaped in Varanasi archived at Ghostarchive.org on 18 Jun 2022

7th-century establishments in India
8th-century establishments in India
Shaiva sects
Varanasi